Ambrose Madden VC (1820 – 1 January 1863) was an officer in the British Army. Born in Cork he was an Irish recipient of the Victoria Cross, the highest and most prestigious award for gallantry in the face of the enemy that can be awarded to British and Commonwealth forces.

Details
He was about 34 years old, and a sergeant-major in the 41st Regiment of Foot, British Army during the Crimean War when the following deed took place for which he was awarded the VC.

On 26 October 1854, in the Crimea, at Little Inkerman, Sergeant Madden headed a party of men of the 41st Regiment which cut off and took prisoner one Russian officer and 14 privates, three of whom were personally captured by the sergeant.

Further information
Madden was commissioned into the 2nd West India Regiment in 1858 and promoted to lieutenant in 1861. He died in Jamaica on 1 January 1863.

See also
 Síol Anmchadha

References

The Register of the Victoria Cross (1981, 1988 and 1997)

Ireland's VCs  (Dept of Economic Development, 1995)
Monuments to Courage (David Harvey, 1999)
Irish Winners of the Victoria Cross (Richard Doherty & David Truesdale, 2000)
The London Gazette, 24 February 1857

1820 births
1863 deaths
Military personnel from County Cork
19th-century Irish people
Irish officers in the British Army
Crimean War recipients of the Victoria Cross
Irish recipients of the Victoria Cross
People from County Cork
West India Regiment officers
British Army personnel of the Crimean War
41st Regiment of Foot soldiers
British Army recipients of the Victoria Cross